Lamellana is a genus of sea slugs, dorid nudibranchs, shell-less marine gastropod molluscs in the family Polyceridae.

Species 
The only species in the genus Lamellana is:
 Lamellana gymnota Lin, 1992

References

Polyceridae
Monotypic gastropod genera